, often referred to as , is a fictional character from Katsura Hoshino's manga D.Gray-man. Nea is former member of the Noah Clan who was murdered by their leader, the Millennium Earl, for betraying the clan. Before passing away, Nea implanted his memories on the series' protagonist, Allen Walker, in order to be reborn. While the earl seeks Nea again, the 14th instead seeks to murder him in revenge and become the new Earl but is constantly fighting a battle against Allen in order to decide who will be the owner of the body.

Nea was based on Hoshino's real life; Originally a triplet, Hoshino lost a sibling and based the idea of having the undead Nea on her own sibling based on the tragedy. His design was based on the character Tyki Mikk, The character is voiced by Ayumu Murase in Japanese. Critical reception to Nea's character has been positive for his relationship with Allen and how enigmatic is his identity which is explored across the series alongside his motivations.

Creation and development
Nea originates from one of the life experiences from Katsura Hoshino. The story of the manga was created with the concept of pairs. This was influenced by Hoshino being a twin sister. As a result, many characters in the series come in the form of pairs. Hoshino part of a set of triplets. But one of the foetuses disappeared in her mother's stomach and only me and her sister were born. Because of this experience, having discussions about that disappeared child is a normal occurrence. Because her named that child, since she was young, Hoshino disappeared other half by their full name. Or wanting to say what if that child is still in my body and breathing together with me or things like that. This also influenced the Noah clan's memories were born from this feeling.

Hoshino plans to give Nea a more direct backstory in the future and states that Cross Marian might be associated within his past. Nea is noted for having a similar appearance to the Noah clan member Tyki Mikk. As a result, among other things, Hoshino made Tyki different by having his hair longer. In Japanese, he is voiced by Ayumu Murase both while possessing Allen and when interacting with him. During recordings of Hallow, Hoshino was surprised by Murase's work, finding him suitable for Allen. Murase's switching between two personalities—Allen and the Nea D. Campbell—impressed the manga author, who thought at first Murase was using a machine to change the tone of them. Although Murase only appeared with the Millennium Earl twice in Hallow, his job left a positive impression.

Appearances
Nea the extra member of the Noah Family and the younger brother of Mana Walker. He was the only member, other than the Ninth Disciple Road and the Earl, who was able to control the Noah's Ark. Before the story's timeline, he gave this power away to a human and ran, betraying the Earl and the Clan of Noah. He attempted to kill the Earl to become the new Earl himself but was killed in return by the Earl. Later, it was revealed that the 14th had chosen Allen Walker as his next host. Some time before his death, he told General Cross Marian that if Mana was looked after, he would return to him one day. As time passes in Allen's life, Nea starts awakening whenever Allen's body is harmed by divine substance known as Innocence, using the first time to call the Earl. The Noah invade the Black Order Headquarters to kidnap Allen but Nea briefly revives to tell the Earl he wants him dead and replace him as the new leader of the Clan.

When Allen is attacked Yu Kanda's Innocence, Nea appears briefly in Allen's mind to name himself "Nea, the one who will destroy everything". However, the possession is stopped by Allen's golem Timcampy and Mana's curse on Allen's eye. The Noah fail to kidnap Allen who is attacked by Apocryphos, leading to his escape. The Noah search the missing Allen alongside the Black Order. Nea fully possesses Allen for brief moments and wonders about the current situation. Once the Earl finds hims again, Nea reveals Earl the truth that both were once a single person but split into two person, Nea and Mana. Both Nea and Mana were adopted by Katherine Eve Campbell until they grew up and Mana murdered Nea. Once Nea kills Mana, he will be able to become the new Millennium Earl, shocking Mana. A depressed Mana abandons his brother Although Nea considers Mana his enemy, he tells Black Order member Howard Link that he will destroy humanity.

Reception and analysis
Reviewers were impressed with the revelation of Nea's revelations and connections with Allen Walker. Allen's curse to transform into the 14th Noah was praised by Grant Goodman of Pop Culture Shock found the discussion as intense as a battle. Alex Osborn of IGN was confused by the revelation and had to watch the scene again in order to understand the narrative. Anne Lauenroth of Anime News Network noted the revelation has a powerful impact on Allen because of his future and because he starts doubting his guardian Mana ever loved him while it leaves Allen's mental state while dealing with it mysterious. Chris Beveridge of the Fandom Post enjoyed the appearance of the 14th Noah in Allen's mind, praising the character's internal conflict. Leroy Douresseaux of Comic Book Bin liked Allen's situation with the 14th in volume 21 and wanted to see more of the same, rather than the focus on Kanda's fight against the Akuma of Alma Karma. In the next volume, Chris Kirby, also of The Fandom Post, was impressed by Allen's possession by Nea. Anne Lauenroth wrote that the struggle between Allen and the 14th Noah left the character in need of a friend. Osborn said he was amazed by Allen's first possession by the 14th Noah; although it was "disturbing", it enhanced the character's development. Lauenroth praised Ayumu Murase's work for voicing two characters; Allen and the 14th Noah at the same time.

Chris Kirby of the Fandom Post found that while Nea's character remains ambiguous when Allen abandons the Order, he still remains appealing due to his connections with both Allen and Timcampy, implying more mysteries to be solved across the narrative. The revelation behind the Earl's true identity alongside Nea's alignment was praised as while the series tends to focus on battles, the manga volume focused on him and Nea focused solely on them with appealing art and wondered about the future of the two Earls. In the book Representing Multiculturalism in Comics and Graphic Novels, Jacob Birken wrote that Allen's use of his powers illustrates the series' theme of identity; although Allen seems to become more human through his Innocence, the revelation that he is the 14th Noah mutes that humanity. Manga.Tokyo considered Allen's transformation into Nea belongs to one of the series' themes: "fate":

"We can't be sure until the season ends, but judging from the heavy religious imagery, Allen's purpose might have been set in stone before even the series begun. He turning into a Noah (taking the appropriate tanning in the process) is probably as important as every other development made in D.Gray-man until now."

References

Comics characters introduced in 2005
D.Gray-man characters
Male characters in anime and manga
Fictional characters based on real people